Linear Recording is a recording studio complex located in Sydney, Australia, which was established by recording engineer Christopher Vallejo and Emren Kara in 2005. Linear Recording is one of Australia's only dedicated all-analogue recording studios. Notable producers who have recorded at Linear Recording include Tony Cohen, Paul McKercher, Wayne Connelly, Nick Littlemore, Tim Whitten, Andrew Klippel, Donnie Sloan, Owen Penglis and Melvin Tree.  Major acts who have recorded there include Jon Spencer Blues Explosion, Robbie Williams, Miley Cyrus, INXS, Josh Pyke, Passenger, Daniel Johns, Peking Duk,  Katie Noonan, PNAU, Empire of the Sun, Wolf & Cub, Mercy Arms, Leroy Lee, The Whitlams, Jessica Mauboy, Dragon and Luke Steele.

Equipment
 AWA P66500 Recording Console - one of only eleven manufactured by Amalgamated Wireless Australasia Limited circa. 1973
 Studer A80 MkIV 2" 24 track
 Ampex MM1200 2" 16 track
 Ampex AG440-8 1" 8-track
 Ampex ATR102 1/4" 2-track
 Ursa Major Space Station SST-282
 EMT 140 Stereo Tube Plate Reverb (x2)
 RCA 44BX ribbon mic
 Wagner (Neumann) U47 tube mic

Instruments
 Fender 73 Rhodes piano
 Hohner D6 Clavinet
 Hohner Pianet T
 Solina ARP String Ensemble
 Wurlitzer 206A Electric Piano
 Hammond M100 Tonewheel Organ + Leslie
 Yamaha Upright Piano
 Fender USA 40th Anniversary Stratocaster
 4 piece 1963 Ludwig-Musser drumkit
 Fender Princeton guitar amp
 Fender Jazz Bass

Discography

 Passenger ... "Whispers" (2014)
 Empire of the Sun ... "Ice on the Dune" (2013)
 Wolf & Cub ... "Heavy Weight" (2013)
 Passenger ... "All The Little Lights" (2012)
 Passenger ... "Let Her Go" (2011)
 Jon Spencer Blues Explosion ... "Black Betty" (7" US single) (2011)
 The Swiss ... "Bubble Bath" (12" single) (2009)
 Leroy Lee ... "Leroy Lee" (2009)
 Josh Pyke ... "Chimney's Afire" (2008)
 Empire of the Sun ... "Walking on a Dream" (2008)
 Van She ... "Strangers" (single) (2008)
 Mercy Arms ... "Mercy Arms" (2008)
 Katie Noonan ... "Skin" (2007)
 Damn Arms ... "The Live Artex" (2007)
 Bluebottle Kiss ... "Slight Return + Out Seeds" (2007)
 Teenager ... "Thirteen" (2007)
 Zac Hurren Trio ... "Exordium" (2007)
 The Saturns ... "Here's The Saturns" (2007)
 Bluebottle Kiss ... "Doubt Seeds" (2006)
 Lost Valentinos ... "Damn & Damn Again" (EP) (2006)

External links
 www.linear-recording.com.au - Linear Recording website

Recording studios in Australia